The 1951 FA Charity Shield was the 29th FA Charity Shield, an annual football match played between the winners of the previous season's Football League and FA Cup competitions. The match took place on 24 September 1951 and was played between 1950–51 Football League champions Tottenham Hotspur and FA Cup winners Newcastle United. It ended in a 2–1 victory for Tottenham Hotspur.

See also
1950–51 Football League
1950–51 FA Cup

References

FA Community Shield
Charity Shield 1951
Charity Shield 1951
Charity Shield
Charity Shield